The 2008 Ontario Scotties Tournament of Hearts was held January 21–27 at the Espanola Curling Club in Espanola, Ontario.  Sherry Middaugh's rink from Coldwater, Ontario won their fourth provincial title.

Teams

Standings

Playoffs
Tie breaker: McGhee 9-3 Hanna

Qualification

Southern Ontario Zone winners
Regional winners in bold. Challenge round qualifiers in bold and italics.

Northern Ontario championship
15 women's teams entered the Northern Ontario championship (the first ever, after the formation of the Northern Ontario Curling Association in 2007). The event was also held in Espanola, and ran from January 3 to 6. Tracy Horgan defeated Krista McCarville 7–6 to win the event. Amy Stachiew and Mari Bolander also qualified for the Ontario Scotties.

References

Ontario Scotties Tournament Of Hearts, 2008
Ontario Scotties Tournament of Hearts
2008 in Ontario